Sir Francis Vyvyan (1575 – 11 June 1635), of Trelowarren in Cornwall, was an English Member of Parliament (MP); his surname is sometimes spelt Vivian.

The eldest son of Hannibal Vyvyan, an MP, High Sheriff of Cornwall and Captain of St Mawes Castle, Francis became Captain of St Mawes Castle himself in 1603. He was MP for Fowey in the Blessed Parliament of 1604 and St Mawes in the Addled Parliament of 1614.

He was briefly Vice-Admiral for South Cornwall in 1607–08 after his father's retirement from that post, and served as High Sheriff of Cornwall in 1617. He was knighted in 1618. However, falling from favour, he was dismissed from the captaincy of St Mawes in 1632 and fined £2000.

He married twice. His eldest son by his second marriage to Loveday Connock, Richard, was knighted shortly before his father's death in 1635, and in 1645 was raised to the dignity of a baronetcy.

References

 Vivian's Visitations of Cornwall (Exeter: William Pollard & Co, 1887) 
 
 Vyvyan genealogy

|-

1575 births
1635 deaths
16th-century English people
17th-century English people
English MPs 1604–1611
English MPs 1614
High Sheriffs of Cornwall
Politicians from Cornwall
Francis
Members of the Parliament of England for St Mawes
Members of the Parliament of England for Fowey